Stephen Kershnar (born 1966) is an American philosopher and distinguished teaching professor at the State University of New York at Fredonia.

His research interests include applied ethics, philosophy of law and political philosophy and he is the author of over eighty articles and book chapters and of nine books.

Education and career 
Kershnar completed his BA at Cornell University (1988), JD at Penn Law (1991), and PhD at the University of Nebraska (1995). In 2006, Kershnar was initially denied promotion to full professor, after he had criticized SUNY Fredonia's new policy regarding "student conduct policies and affirmative action practices". In early 2022, his arguments on "adult-child sex" in a philosophy podcast attracted criticism and led to him being banned from campus and teaching, pending an investigation. Kershnar has received support for his academic freedom rights in connection with this controversy from both the Academic Freedom Alliance and from FIRE (the Foundation for Individual Rights in Education).

Awards 
Kershnar is recipient of various faculty awards, most notably:

 Chancellor's Award for Excellence in Teaching (2002) 
 William T. and Charlotte N. Hagan Young Scholar/Artist Award (2003) 
 Robert W. Kasling Lecture Award, for "Counterintuitive Morality" (2008) 
 Chancellor's Award for Excellence in Scholarship and Creative Activities (2010-2011)

Books
As of February 2022, Kershnar has published 12 books:

 Desert, Retribution and Torture (2001). A defence of retributivism.
 Sex, Discrimination, and Violence: Surprising and Unpopular Results in Applied Ethics (2009). Kershnar argues for a number of controversial views, e.g., that adult-child sex is not always wrong and that professional schools may and probably should discriminate against women.
 Desert and Virtue: A Theory of Intrinsic Value (2010). Kershnar demonstrates how desert relates to virtue, good deeds, moral responsibility, and personal change and growth through the life process.
 For Torture: A Rights-based Defence (2012).  Kershnar argues that torture is justified in a number of theoretical contexts, including defence, punishment, and when the person to be tortured consents.
 Justice for the Past (2012). Kershnar argues that programs such as affirmative action and calls for slavery reparations are unjust.
 Gratitude toward Veterans: Why Americans Should Not Be Very Grateful to Veterans (2014). Kershnar looks at whether veterans typically satisfy the conditions for gratitude and argues that they do not.
 Pedophilia and Adult-Child Sex: A Philosophical Analysis (2015). Kershnar argues that it seems plausible that the criminalization of willing adult-child sex is justified but expresses concern about whether armchair evaluations of empirical effects are enough to warrant criminal punishment.
 Does the Pro-Life Worldview Make Sense?: Abortion, Hell, and Violence Against Abortion Doctors (2017). Kershnar argues that some of the principles which Christian pro-life advocates are committed to are inconsistent.
 Total Collapse: The Case Against Responsibility and Morality (2018). Kershnar argues that there is no morality and that people are not morally responsible for what they do. He acknowledges that the philosophical costs of denying moral responsibility and morality are enormous.

References

External links
 Kershnar interviewed by podcaster Thaddeus Russell
 Audio of the video which led to Kershnar's pending investigation at Fredonia

1966 births
Living people
21st-century American philosophers
American political philosophers
University of Pennsylvania Law School alumni
Cornell University alumni
State University of New York at Fredonia faculty
University of Nebraska–Lincoln alumni